Novoalexeyevsky is a rural locality (a khutor) in Dmitriyevskoye Rural Settlement of Koshekhablsky District, Adygea, Russia. The population was 325 as of 2018. There are 7 streets.

Geography 
Novoalexeyevsky is located 13 km northwest of Koshekhabl (the district's administrative centre) by road. Plodopitomnik is the nearest rural locality.

References 

Rural localities in Koshekhablsky District